Bellevue is a village in Brown County, Wisconsin. It was a town until incorporating as a village on February 14, 2003. The population was 14,570 at the time of the 2010 census. Bellevue is part of the Green Bay metropolitan area. Bellevue sits around 4.34 miles (6.99km) east from central Green Bay.

History
Bellevue was named for the French words meaning "beautiful view".

Geography

Bellevue is located at  (44.463878, −87.965106).

Climate

Demographics

2010 census
As of the census of 2010, there were 14,570 people, 5,876 households, and 3,883 families living in the village. The racial makeup of the village was 87.5% White, 1.0% African American, 0.9% Native American, 3.9% Asian, 4.9% from other races, and 1.9% from two or more races. Hispanic or Latino of any race were 9.3% of the population.

There were 5,876 households, of which 33.7% had children under the age of 18 living with them, 53.5% were married couples living together, 9.0% had a female householder with no husband present, 3.7% had a male householder with no wife present, and 33.9% were non-families. 26.5% of all households were made up of individuals, and 9.4% had someone living alone who was 65 years of age or older. The average household size was 2.48 and the average family size was 3.04.

The median age in the village was 36.3 years. 25.8% of residents were under the age of 18; 8.3% were between the ages of 18 and 24; 27.5% were from 25 to 44; 27.4% were from 45 to 64; and 10.9% were 65 years of age or older. The gender makeup of the village was 48.7% male and 51.3% female.

2000 census

As of the census of 2000, there were 11,828 people, 4,624 households, and 3,111 families living in the village. The population density was 829.0 people per square mile (320.0/km2). There were 4,759 housing units at an average density of 333.5 per square mile (128.8/km2). The racial makeup of the village was 95.40% White, 0.51% African American, 0.84% Native American, 1.35% Asian, 0.02% Pacific Islander, 1.10% from other races, and 0.79% from two or more races. Hispanic or Latino of any race were 2.62% of the population.

There were 4,624 households, out of which 36.7% had children under the age of 18 living with them, 56.2% were married couples living together, 7.6% had a female householder with no husband present, and 32.7% were non-families. 23.1% of all households were made up of individuals, and 4.3% had someone living alone who was 65 years of age or older. The average household size was 2.54 and the average family size was 3.08.

In the village, the population was spread out, with 26.9% under the age of 18, 9.6% from 18 to 24, 36.1% from 25 to 44, 20.2% from 45 to 64, and 7.2% who were 65 years of age or older. The median age was 33 years. For every 100 females, there were 98.1 males. For every 100 females age 18 and over, there were 97.1 males.

The median income for a household in the village was $53,672, and the median income for a family was $62,299. Males had a median income of $40,194 versus $26,189 for females. The per capita income for the village was $24,283. About 3.3% of families and 4.2% of the population were below the poverty line, including 4.3% of those under age 18 and 9.6% of those age 65 or over.

References

External links
 Village of Bellevue

Former census-designated places in Wisconsin
Villages in Wisconsin
Villages in Brown County, Wisconsin
Green Bay metropolitan area